Jogin II is a mountain of the Garhwal Himalaya in Uttarakhand India.The elevation of Jogin II is  and its prominence is . It is 110th highest located entirely within the Uttrakhand. Nanda Devi, is the highest mountain in this category. It lies 6.2 km east of Gangotri III and 7 km west of Bhrigupanth . It lies 2.2 km north of Jogin I. Its nearest higher neighbor is Jogin I . It is located 7.2 km NW of Thalay Sagar  and 8.5 km NW lies Gangotri I .

Gangotri National Park
The entire surrounding area are protected within the  Gangotri National Park, one of the largest conservation area in India. The Gangotri National Park is home to several world-class treks, including Gangotri Gomukh Tapoban Nandanvan, Kerdarnath Vasuki tal trek, Har ki dun valley trek,  Badrinath to Satopanth tal trek, Gangotri to Kedar tal trek, Gangotri to Badrinath trek via Kalindi khal and many more.

Climbing history

Two consecutive expedition led by Amulya Sen finally bore the success in making the first ascent of Jogin II (20,208 feet) after A previous year unsuccessful attempts. Asit Moitra and three Sherpas Ajiba, Nima Dorje and Ang Chhutar reached the summit On October 11, 1971.

A Japanese expedition led by Jushichiro Otsubo climbed Jogin I  and Jogin II. On August 19 Jushichiro Otsubo, Mrs. Yachiyo Yamanaka, Mrs. Kimiko Yamashita, Yukio Shiozawa, Hideaki Nara and Mrs. Kieko Tezuka reached the summit of Jogin I and on August 21, Kazutoshi Okuya and Tokuji Iida climbed to the summit of Jogin II .

Neighboring and subsidiary peaks
neighboring or subsidiary peaks of Jogin I:
 Thalay Sagar: 
 Meru Peak: 
 Manda III: 
 Shivling: 
 Gangotri I: 
 Gangotri II: 
 Gangotri III:

Glaciers and rivers

On the eastern side lies Kedar Bamak and on the western side lies Rudugaira Bamak. Kedar Ganga emerges from Kedar bamak and joins Bhagirathi River near Gangotri. Rudugaira nala emerges from Rudugaira Bamak also joins Bhagirathi river close to Gangotri. Both the glacier drain down to Bhagirathi River near Gangotri. One of the main tributaries of river Ganga. Bhagirathi joins the Alaknanda River the other main tributaries of river Ganga at Dev Prayag and called Ganga there after.

See also

 List of Himalayan peaks of Uttarakhand

References

Mountains of Uttarakhand
Six-thousanders of the Himalayas
Geography of Chamoli district